Craigville may refer to any one of the following:

Craigville, a community now part of Miramichi, New Brunswick
Craigville, Indiana
Craigville, New York, a hamlet in the Town of Blooming Grove, New York